Getaneh is a male given name of Ethiopian origin that may refer to:

Getaneh Kebede (born 1992), Ethiopian footballer
Getaneh Molla (born 1994), Ethiopian long-distance runner
Genet Getaneh (born 1986), Ethiopian long-distance road runner

Ethiopian given names
Amharic-language names